Eccellenza Sicily is the regional Eccellenza football division for clubs in Sicily, Italy. It is competed amongst 32 teams, in two different groups (A and B). The winners of the Groups are promoted to Serie D. The clubs who finish second also have the chance to gain promotion, they are entered into a national play-off which consists of two rounds.

Champions
Here are the past champions of the Sicilian Eccellenza, organised into their respective group.

Group A

1991–92 Vittoria
1992–93 Milazzo
1993–94 Gravina
1994–95 Nissa
1995–96 Orlandina 
1996–97 Mazara
1997–98 Agrigento
1998–99 Gattopardo
1999–2000 Panormus 
2000–01 Pro Favara
2001–02 Marsala
2002–03 Fincantieri
2003–04 Folgore Castelvetrano
2004–05 Campobello
2005–06 Paternò
2006–07 Alcamo
2007–08 Nissa
2008–09 Mazara
2009–10 Marsala
2010–11 Licata
2011–12 Ribera
2012–13 Akragas
2013–14 Leonfortese
2014–15 Marsala
2015–16 Gela
2016–17 Paceco
2017–18 Marsala
2018–19 Licata
2019–20 Dattilo Noir
2020–21 Sancataldese
2021–22 Canicattì

Group B

1991–92 Partinico
1992–93 Bagheria
1993–94 Canicatti
1994–95 Caltagirone
1995–96 Peloro Messina
1996–97 Vittoria
1997–98 Siracusa
1998–99 Caltagirone
1999–2000 Paternò
2000–01 Belpasso
2001–02 Misterbianco
2002–03 Modica
2003–04 Giarre
2004–05 Comiso
2005–06 Licata
2006–07 Libertas Acate-Modica
2007–08 Castiglione
2008–09 Milazzo
2009–10 Acireale 
2010–11 A.C. Palazzolo
2011–12 Ragusa
2012–13 Orlandina
2013–14 Tiger Brolo
2014–15 Città di Siracusa
2015–16 Igea Virtus
2016–17 S.C. Palazzolo
2017–18 Città di Messina
2018–19 Marina di Ragusa
2019–20 Paternò
2020–21 Giarre
2021–22 Ragusa

Current teams (2021–22)

Girone A

Girone B

References

External links
Some Club Histories In the League
Sicilian Eccellenza Current Tables

Sicily
Sports leagues established in 1991
1991 establishments in Italy
Football in Sicily

Association football clubs established in 1991